Alcide Herveaux is a fictional character from the Southern Vampire Mysteries/Sookie Stackhouse novels by author Charlaine Harris. He is a Were (a full blooded werewolf) who owns a construction company in Jackson, Mississippi with his father. He is depicted as a tall man with green eyes, olive skin, and thick, tousled black hair.

Book series biography
The author introduces this character in the third novel, Club Dead, when Eric sends Alcide to help Sookie find Bill Compton who has been kidnapped by his "maker" Lorena. Alcide and Sookie seem to have a chemistry from the beginning, but he is emotionally tied to his on-again, off-again girlfriend, Debbie Pelt (who shifts into a lynx). Sookie "liked him very much."

In the fourth book, Dead to the World, it is revealed that his ex, Debbie, had participated in vampire Bill Compton’s torture. Alcide then abjures (banishes) her from the Shreveport pack. At the end of this book, Sookie kills Debbie in self-defense. Alcide notes Debbie's scent at Sookie's house and realizes that Sookie killed her, which would always stand between Alcide and Sookie as a potential couple.

In the fifth novel, Dead as a Doornail, Alcide involves Sookie in the battle for pack leader between his father and Patrick Furnan. Alcide wants Sookie to use her telepathic abilities because many believe that Patrick Furnan will cheat. Even though Patrick is found guilty of cheating, he still wins, kills Alcide's father and becomes leader of the Long Tooth pack. Alcide thinks that Sookie failed him, and in his rage and anger of the loss of his father, he blames Sookie.

Alcide later begins to date Maria-Star Cooper, but in From Dead to Worse she is brutally killed. Sookie is also attacked twice by unknown weres and there are other murders and disappearances. The Long Tooth pack becomes severely divided, blaming each other for these attacks, and a war seems inevitable. Sookie acts as a mediator between these two groups and it turns out that these murders and disappearance were caused by another pack led by Priscilla Hebert, sister to Patrick Furnan's right-hand man. A battle erupts, ending with the deaths of Patrick Furnan and most of Priscilla's pack. Alcide becomes the leader of the Long Tooth pack.

In the tenth book, Dead in the Family, Alcide arranges for the pack to have their monthly hunt on Sookie's property. Several days after the weres find some unusual tracks, a dead werewolf is discovered. Alcide's girlfriend Annabelle confesses to infidelity with the murdered were. Alcide calls upon Sookie to take a shaman potion to find the traitor(s) in the pack.

Television portrayal
Actor Joe Manganiello portrays Alcide in HBO's True Blood series.
Alcide is somewhat in love with Sookie but knows the relationship can never be due to Sookie killing Debbie in self-defense although they do kiss in an episode. At the end of season 6, it is shown that Sookie and Alcide are officially together, however, he dies protecting her in season 7.

References

Fictional werewolves
Fictional characters with superhuman strength
Fictional businesspeople
Fictional characters from Mississippi
Fictional characters from Louisiana
Literary characters introduced in 2003
The Southern Vampire Mysteries characters